The Minch, also called North Minch, is a strait in north-west Scotland, separating the north-west Highlands and the northern Inner Hebrides from Lewis and Harris in the Outer Hebrides.

The Lower Minch, also known as the Little Minch, is the Minch's southern extension, separating Skye from the lower Outer Hebrides: North Uist, Benbecula, South Uist, Barra etc. It opens into the Sea of the Hebrides. The Little Minch is the northern limit of the Sea of the Hebrides.

Geography
The Minch and Lower Minch form part of the Inner Seas off the West Coast of Scotland, as defined by the International Hydrographic Organization.

It is believed to be the site of the biggest meteorite ever to hit the British Isles. In June 2010 Eilidh Macdonald became the first person to swim across it from Waternish Point on Skye to Rodel on Harris, in a time of  hours.

Navigation
A traffic separation scheme operates in the Little Minch, with northbound traffic proceeding close to Skye, and southbound close to Harris. Commercial ferry services across the Minch are operated by Caledonian MacBrayne.

Lighthouses
In the south, its entrance is marked by lighthouses at Barra Head, Ushenish and Hyskeir. On Skye, there are lights at Neist Point, Vaternish and An t-Iasgair. The Outer Hebrides are marked by Weavers Point, Eilean Glas, Tiumpan Head and Butt of Lewis. To the east are Rubha Réidh, Stoer Head and Cape Wrath lighthouses.

Other navigational aids
A buoy marks Eugenie Rock (named after the vessel that grounded there in May 1859) and the nearby Sgeir Graidach. Previously, these hazards were marked by a red-painted beacon on Sgeir Graidach, the foundations of which can still be seen at low tide.

Mythology
The mythological blue men of the Minch live in the area.

Conservation
Pollution is a particular concern as the Minch is a busy shipping lane;  of shipping pass through the channel each month.

See also
 Mid-Minch Gaelic

Notes and references

External links
Western Isles local government Minch project
Gazetteer for Scotland

Scottish coast
Straits of Scotland
Landforms of Highland (council area)
Landforms of the Outer Hebrides
European seas